The Córdoba Argentina Temple is a temple of the Church of Jesus Christ of Latter-day Saints (LDS Church) in the Villa Belgrano neighborhood of Cordoba, Argentina.

History
The temple was completed in 2015. Its planned construction was announced by church president Thomas S. Monson on October 4, 2008, during the church's 178th Semiannual General Conference .  A later press release indicated that the temple will be built adjacent to the Argentina Córdoba Mission headquarters. The Córdoba temple is the second in Argentina, after the Buenos Aires Argentina Temple.

The groundbreaking was October 30, 2010, presided over by Neil L. Andersen, who was accompanied by Walter F. Gonzalez, Mervyn B. Arnold, and Marcos A. Aidukaitis. A public open house was held April 17 through May 2, 2015, excluding Sundays. The temple was formally dedicated by Dieter F. Uchtdorf on May 17, 2015.

In 2020, the Córdoba Argentina Temple was temporarily closed temporarily during the year in response to the coronavirus pandemic.

See also

 Comparison of temples of The Church of Jesus Christ of Latter-day Saints
 List of temples of The Church of Jesus Christ of Latter-day Saints
 List of temples of The Church of Jesus Christ of Latter-day Saints by geographic region
 Temple architecture (Latter-day Saints)
 The Church of Jesus Christ of Latter-day Saints in Argentina

References

External links
Córdoba Argentina Temple Official site
Córdoba Argentina Temple at ChurchofJesusChristTemples.org

21st-century Latter Day Saint temples
Buildings and structures in Córdoba, Argentina
Religious buildings and structures in Argentina
Temples (LDS Church) in Argentina
The Church of Jesus Christ of Latter-day Saints in Argentina
2015 establishments in Argentina
2015 in Christianity
Religious buildings and structures completed in 2015